Whenever You Need Somebody is the debut studio album by English singer Rick Astley, released on 16 November 1987 by RCA Records. It is his best-selling album and, according to his own official website, has sold 15.2 million copies worldwide. The album is listed as the 136th best-selling album in Spain, and was the seventh best-selling album of 1987 in the United Kingdom. A remastered version containing rare remixes and extended versions, was released on 12 April 2010. 

Celebrating the 15th anniversary for the Record Store Day UK, a reissue was set to be released on 23 April 2022 as a limited edition with a red vinyl, only 1800 of them would be sold.  After 35 years, a 2022 remastered edition of the album was released on 6 May 2022, including a double CD album with a Pianoforte version of "Never Gonna Give You Up", the reimagined versions of "Together Forever", "Whenever You Need Somebody", and "When I Fall In Love" on the CD1 from his compilation album The Best of Me, also included with B-sides, instrumentals, and remixes for the CD2. The Amazon exclusive signed edition of the album was also available to pre-order, all hand-signed and only limited to 2000 copies. Due to the unavoidable global supply chain issues, it was rescheduled to be released on 20 May 2022.

The writing credit of Dick Spatsley on "The Love Has Gone" was a reference to a running gag by Smash Hits magazine that deliberately misspelled his name.

Track listing

2010 expanded remaster

2022 Remaster

2022 Remaster (digital)

Personnel
Credits adapted from the liner notes of Whenever You Need Somebody.

Musicians
 Rick Astley – vocals ; guitars 
 Mike Stock – keyboards
 Matt Aitken – keyboards, guitars
 A. Linn – drums
 Ian Curnow – Fairlight programming ; keyboards 
 Daize Washbourn – keyboards, drums 
 Gary Barnacle – saxophone 
 Shirley Lewis, Dee Lewis, Mae McKenna, Suzanne Rhatigan – backing vocals

Technical
 Stock Aitken Waterman – production 
 Phil Harding – production, mixing 
 Ian Curnow – production 
 Daize Washbourn – production 
 Mark McGuire – engineering ; mixing 
 Phil Harding, Karen Hewitt, Mike Duffy, Jamie Bromfield – additional engineering
 Yoyo, Jonathan King, Peter Day, Boky, Gordon Dennis – engineering assistance
 Pete Hammond – mixing

Charts

Weekly charts

Year-end charts

Certifications

References

1987 debut albums
Albums arranged by Gordon Jenkins
Albums produced by Stock Aitken Waterman
RCA Records albums
Rick Astley albums